SABC Africa was the international television service of the South African Broadcasting Corporation, which ceased to broadcast on 1 August 2008 after poor performance on the DStv satellite television platform.

The channel broadcast a variety of news and entertainment shows. The SABC's similar radio service Channel Africa continues to operate.

External links
SABC Africa official website

Television stations in South Africa
Television channels and stations disestablished in 2008
Defunct mass media in South Africa